The 2017 BeNe Ladies Tour was the fourth edition of the BeNe Ladies Tour, a women's cycling stage race in the Netherlands. It is rated by the UCI as a category 2.1 race.

Stages

Classification leadership

See also

 2017 in women's road cycling

References

BeNe Ladies Tour
BeNe Ladies Tour